Tommy Svindal Larsen (born 11 August 1973) is a Norwegian former professional footballer who played as a defensive midfielder for Odd, Start and Stabæk in his home country, in addition to a four-year spell at 1. FC Nürnberg in Germany. Svindal Larsen was capped 24 times for Norway.

Club career
Svindal Larsen was born in Skien. In his youth, he was regarded as an exceptionally talented player. He made his senior debut for Odd in the First Division as a 15-year-old, and was signed by Start at 17 ahead of the 1991 season. While he played regularly for the Kristiansand club, he was overshadowed by other players and left Start at the end of the 1994 season, having only briefly showcased his great potential. He then joined newly promoted Stabæk.

At Stabæk, Svindal Larsen became a first-team regular. In the early years of his career, Svindal Larsen had been regarded as a creative attacking midfielder, but during his time at Stabæk he was converted to more of a midfield anchor, and thrived in that role. He formed an excellent midfield partnership at Stabæk alongside Martin Andresen, and won his first major trophy in 1998, when he captained the Stabæk side that won the Norwegian Cup.

After six years at Stabæk, Svindal Larsen wanted to play abroad, and joined German side 1. FC Nürnberg on a Bosman free transfer at the end of the 2001 season. He spent four years with the Bundesliga side, playing more than a hundred games before returning home to his first club Odd where he spent the remainder of his career, captaining his hometown team for six seasons before retiring in 2011.

International career
Svindal Larsen was capped by Norway at every youth level from Under-15 to Under-21, and is current record holder for most total international games played for Norway's age-delimited national teams, with 99 youth caps in total, including a record 41 caps for Norway Under-21.

However, despite his success at youth level, Svindal Larsen never truly made his mark in senior international football. He had to wait until April 1996, a few months before his 23rd birthday, before he got his full international debut in a friendly against Spain, and did not start an international match until a January 1999 friendly against Israel. In total, Svindal Larsen was capped 24 times by the Norway senior national team, and ten of those appearances was as a substitute. Tired of being selected for the international squad only to sit on the bench, Svindal Larsen announced his retirement from international football in 2007.

Personal life
Svindal Larsen is married and has four children.

Career statistics

References

External links
 

Living people
1973 births
Sportspeople from Skien
Norwegian footballers
Association football midfielders
Norway international footballers
Norway under-21 international footballers
Norway youth international footballers
Eliteserien players
Norwegian First Division players
Bundesliga players
2. Bundesliga players
Odds BK players
IK Start players
1. FC Nürnberg players
Stabæk Fotball players
Norwegian expatriate footballers
Norwegian expatriate sportspeople in Germany
Expatriate footballers in Germany